Trebullett is a hamlet in Cornwall, England, United Kingdom. It is about one mile west of Lezant. Another hamlet, Lower Trebullett, is further south.

References

External links

Hamlets in Cornwall